Madinat Khalifa may refer to:

 Madinat Khalifa North, a district of Doha
 Madinat Khalifa South, a district of Doha